Moba Airport  is an airport serving the cities of Kirungu and Moba in Democratic Republic of the Congo.

See also

Transport in the Democratic Republic of the Congo
List of airports in the Democratic Republic of the Congo

References

External links
 OpenStreetMap - Moba Airport
 OurAirports - Moba
 FallingRain - Moba Airport
 HERE Maps - Moba
 

Airports in Tanganyika Province